Kulluh illa keda (Everything Except That) is a 1936 Egyptian drama film directed by Edmon Tuéma, with story, screenplay, and dialogue by Mohamed Younis Al Qadi. The film stars Baba Azzeddine, Mohamed Kamal El Masry, Abdel Hamid Zaki, and Sirena Ibrahim. It tells the story of Shahin, a fruit merchant who aspires to a life of debauchery and becomes acquainted with the dancer Fakiha who steals his heart and cons him out of his money. Eventually, Fakiha uses her cunning to establish a nightclub using Shahin's stolen fortune, forcing him to work in the establishment he unwittingly funded.

The film was released in Egyptian theaters on December 7, 1936.

The film received a rating of 5.7/10 on the Arabic film database "elcinema.com".

Plot
Shahin, a fruit merchant, aspires to a life of debauchery and becomes acquainted with Fakiha, a dancer who steals his heart. As Fakiha cons him out of his money, Shahin's financial situation worsens. Eventually, Fakiha uses her cunning and Shahin's stolen fortune to establish a nightclub, forcing Shahin to work in the very establishment he unwittingly funded.

Cast
 Baba Azzeddine as Fakiha
 Mohamed Kamal El Masry as Sharafantah (Sharafantah)
 Abdel Hamid Zaki as Shahin
 Sirena Ibrahim as Umm Mufida (أم مفيدة)
 Fathia Fouad
 Saleh Al-Jahly
 Ibrahim Al-Jazar
 Amin Allaf
 Sayed Mustafa as Ali

Reception
Kulluh illa keda received a rating of 5.7/10 on the Arabic film database "elcinema.com". The film is considered a classic Egyptian drama from the 1930s.

References

External links
 
 Kulluh illa keda on elcinema.com (Arabic)

1936 films
Egyptian films
Arabic-language films
Egyptian drama films
1930s drama films

ar:كله إلا كده (فيلم)